Robert Goelet may refer to:
 Robert Goelet Sr. (1809–1879)
 Robert Goelet (1841–1899), real estate developer
 Robert Walton Goelet (1880–1941), his son, real estate developer
 Robert Wilson Goelet (1880–1966), American social leader, banker, and real estate developer

See also
Robert Goulet (1933–2007), American singer and actor